Fuku may refer to:

Fuku (Tenchi Muyo!), a character in Tenchi Muyo! GXP
Fuku Station, a train station in Nishiyodogawa-ku, Osaka, Japan
Fugu or Fuku, pufferfish
Fuku, part of Momofuku (restaurants)

People with the name
Hiroto Fuku (born 1992), Japanese baseball player
Mitsutarō Fuku (1898-1965), Japanese photographer
Tei Fuku (1330-?), Chinese politician 
Fuku Suzuki (born 2004), Japanese actor 
Fuku Akino (1908-2001), Japanese painter
Lady Kasuga (1579–1643), true name: Saitō Fuku (斉藤福) was a Japanese noble lady

See also
Seifuku or Japanese school uniform

Japanese-language surnames
Japanese unisex given names